Happy Family is an organic and baby food company in the US. It was ranked No. 2 in Inc. Magazines 2011 list of the 500 Fastest-Growing Companies, in the food industry category.

History
Happy Family was founded in 2003 by Shazi Visram. Visram developed the idea as a graduate student at Columbia Business School, where she studied the baby-food market and child nutrition, and began building the company while in business school. In 2005, Jessica Rolph joined as COO and founding partner. Rolph, a Cornell Business School graduate, had a prior career at Whole Foods in research. T

he company launched its first products on Mother's Day in 2006 - a line of organic, fresh-frozen baby meals sold through a New York grocery store chain.

By 2010, Happy Family grew to more than $13 million in sales and was ranked 68th in Inc. Magazine's list of fastest-growing companies, with three-year growth of over 3,000%.  By the end of 2012, the company employed more than 70 people, and its products were available in over 14,000 stores and 30 countries.

The company secured $30 million in debt and equity financing from individual private investors through a number of financing rounds rather than selling equity to private equity or venture capital groups. In May of 2013, Groupe Danone acquired a 92% stake in the company with both Visram and Rolph as current owner partners.

References

External links
 

Food and drink companies established in 2006
Baby food manufacturers
Organic farming organizations
Food and drink companies based in New York City
2006 establishments in New York (state)
American companies established in 2006
Groupe Danone brands